Bowlusville is an unincorporated community in Champaign County, in the U.S. state of Ohio.

History
Bowlusville was platted in 1863 by Samuel H. Bowlus, and named for him. A post office was established at Bowlusville in 1861, and remained in operation until 1920.

References

Unincorporated communities in Champaign County, Ohio
Unincorporated communities in Ohio